Majboor is a 1989 Indian Hindi-language action film, Produced by R. Joshi on Bhagavati Pictures banner and directed by T. Rama Rao. Starring Jeetendra, Sunny Deol, Jaya Prada, Farha Naaz in the pivotal roles and music composed by Laxmikant–Pyarelal.

Plot
Justice Dinanath a man of righteousness lives a happy life with his wife Shanta and two sons, advocate Ravi one that stands for piety, and Inspector Sunil (Sunny Deol) a sheer cop. The family also joins an orphan baby girl Jyoti adopted by Ravi. Besides, Mayor Kishan Chand, a spiteful conducts vandalism in society. Here, Ravi & Sunil audaciously encounters his crimes. In tandem, Sunil falls for the beautiful Priya. Once, Teja Kishan Chand’s son molests and kills his employee Susheela the friend of Priya who witnesses the crime. Sunil red-handedly apprehends him and Ravi prosecutes the case. At that juncture, Kishan Chand tries to bribe them when he is turned away by Dinanath proclaiming his house as a disciple of justice. The court penalizes life to Teja and also fires Kishan Chand from power. Thereby, infuriated Kishan Chand pledges to destroy Dinanath’s family.

Afterward, Ravi brings his love interest Sharda home that releasing him from prison and concealing her identity. Soon, Sharda wins their hearts hence, the elders to couple her with Ravi. During the time of their wedding, Kishan Chand colludes with a prisoner Jankidas and creates turmoil by claiming Sharda as his wife. Eventually, the silence of Ravi & Sharda leads to the death of Dinanath. Then, Ravi & Sharda quit the house. Now, Jankidas files up the case against Ravi where he is mortified and also accused of a crime made by blackguards. Since the situation is adverse, Sharda divulges the fact to the family, Ravi & Sharda are love birds in college and when Ravi learns Sharda is pregnant, he decides to immediately marry her. However, Jankidas obstructs it and excruciates Sharda to knit him instead of his debt. At that point, Ravi promises to repay the account while on his return Jankidas backstabs him and wedlock Sharda forcibly. But she escapes, moves in search of Ravi, and is attacked by Jankidas’s men when badly hurt Ravi kills one of them. Next, Sharda admits the crime to safeguard Ravi and suffers imprisonment. At present, she also affirms Jyothi as their daughter. At last Sunil and Ravi cease the baddies. Finally, the movie ends on a happy note with the reunion of the family.

Cast

 Jeetendra as Ravi
 Sunny Deol as Inspector Sunil
 Jaya Prada as Sharda
 Farha Naaz as Priya (Sunil's love interest)
 Ashok Kumar as Justice Deenanath
 Seema Deo as Ravi and Sunil's mother
 Prem Chopra as Kishanchand
 Shakti Kapoor as Janki Das
 Kader Khan as Teli Ram & Chameli Ram (dual role)
 Asrani as Police Constable
Chandrashekhar as Sevakram Minister 
 Aruna Irani as Sharda's Mother
 Johnny Lever
 Tej Sapru as Tejaa,Kishanchand Son
 Kunika as Sushila, Priya's friend
 Mahesh Anand as Sangram
 Yunus Parvez as Bhakti Prasad Bar Owner
 Dinesh Hingoo as Lawyer of Bar Owner 
 Bharat Bhushan as Judge during Bhakti Prasad case hearing
Pinchoo Kapoor as Judge during Sharda case Hearing
 Vikas Anand as Dr. Malhotra 
Chandrashekhar Dubey as Pandit
Kamaldeep as Village Sarpanch

Soundtrack
Lyricist: Anand Bakshi

External links

1980s Hindi-language films
1989 films
Films directed by T. Rama Rao
Films scored by Laxmikant–Pyarelal